Lee Tae-yong (born July 1, 1995), known mononymously as Taeyong, is a South Korean rapper, singer, songwriter, and dancer. He is a member and leader of South Korean boy band NCT under SM Entertainment, having debuted in the group's first sub-unit, NCT U, in 2016 and becoming the leader of its second sub-unit, NCT 127, later that year. In 2019, he debuted as a member of the South Korean supergroup SuperM, a joint project under SM Entertainment and Capitol Records, and released his first solo single, "Long Flight". As a songwriter, Taeyong has participated in writing over 40 songs in four languages, released mostly by NCT's various units and himself as a soloist.

Life and career

Early life 
Lee Taeyong was born on July 1, 1995, in Gwanak-gu, Seoul, South Korea. He graduated from the School of Performing Arts Seoul.

2012–2016: Pre-debut activities 
In 2012, Taeyong was scouted on the street by an SM Entertainment recruiter and joined the company after successfully passing the audition by singing the South Korean national anthem. In the same year, he participated in the poster shooting of the SBS television series To the Beautiful You. On December 2, 2013, Taeyong was introduced as a member of SM Rookies, a pre-debut team of trainees under SM Entertainment.

In 2014, Taeyong appeared in multiple magazines alongside now-NCT member Johnny and now-Red Velvet members Irene and Seulgi. In July 2014, a video of Taeyong performing part of his song "Open the Door" was published on SMTown's YouTube channel. Later that year, he appeared with several future NCT members on the Mnet-produced Exo 90:2014, a show starring labelmates Exo, where they danced to K-pop songs from the 1990s. Taeyong also participated in the music video remake of Shinhwa's "Yo!" and Fly To The Sky's "Missing You". In October 2014, he featured on Red Velvet's song "Be Natural", credited then as SR14B Taeyong.

2016–2018: Debuts with NCT, NCT U, and NCT 127 

On April 3, 2016, Taeyong was confirmed as a member of boy group NCT and its first sub-unit, NCT U. He made his official debut with the release of NCT U's digital single "The 7th Sense" on April 8, in which he and Mark participated in songwriting. Later that year, Taeyong was announced as a member and leader of NCT's second sub-unit, the Seoul-based NCT 127. On July 6, 2016, he made his debut with NCT 127 with their single "Fire Truck". Three days later, they released their first extended play (EP), NCT #127, for which Taeyong co-wrote three songs. He became the group's main rapper and main dancer despite having no background in dance prior to his training and his dance coach expressing doubts whether he would be able to catch up with his peers.

In January 2017, NCT 127 returned with the EP Limitless. Taeyong participated in writing four songs on the album, with the track "Baby Don't Like It" marking the first time he was credited as a composer. In June, the group released their third EP, Cherry Bomb. All songs on the album, save one, were co-written by Taeyong. The title track, "Cherry Bomb", was later named as one of the best K-pop songs of the year by Billboard and Idolator. That same year, Taeyong participated in two collaborations with fellow SM Entertainment artists Hitchhiker and Yoo Young-jin. "Around", an experimental song produced by Hitchhiker, was released with an accompanying music video in May through the SM Station project. He worked with singer and producer Yoo Young-jin on the rock ballad "Cure", which was released in August 2017, also through SM Station. Together with NCT 127's vocalists Taeil and Doyoung, Taeyong appeared on the soundtrack for the drama School 2017, featuring as rapper in and songwriter for the R&B ballad "Stay in My Life".

In March 2018, NCT released their first studio album as part of a large-scale project uniting all of its sub-units, NCT 2018 Empathy. Taeyong appeared in five of the units featured on the album and participated in writing five songs for Empathy. In May 2018, Taeyong joined the cast of Food Diary, a variety show following a group of celebrities exploring farming and the process of food production, together with labelmate BoA.

Taeyong co-wrote four songs for NCT 127's first studio album, Regular-Irregular, including lead single "Regular". The song was initially released in English and Korean but later also served as the debut single of NCT's Chinese sub-unit, WayV.

2019–present: Solo activities and debut with SuperM 
In April 2019, NCT 127 released their first Japanese studio album, Awaken, for which Taeyong co-wrote the song "Lips". In July 2019, Taeyong released his first solo song, "Long Flight", which he wrote and co-composed, with an accompanying music video. The track served as the finale of the third season of the SM Station project. The song debuted at number six on Billboard World Digital Song Sales chart. On August 8, 2019, Taeyong was revealed as a member of SuperM, a K-pop supergroup created by SM Entertainment in collaboration with Capitol Records. The group's promotions began in October and were aimed at the American market. They released their first EP, SuperM, for which Taeyong co-wrote and co-produced the song "No Manners". Also in August, Taeyong and Punch collaborated on a soundtrack song for television series Hotel del Luna, titled "Love del Luna". Later that year, Taeyong featured on Marteen's "Mood".

In March 2020, NCT 127 released their second studio album, Neo Zone. Taeyong participated in co-writing three songs for the album. It was commercially successful and debuted at number five on the US Billboard 200, selling more than one million copies in South Korea together with its repackage, Neo Zone: The Final Round. Later that year, SuperM released their first studio album, Super One, for which Taeyong co-wrote the song "Together At Home". In September 2020, NCT's second group-wide project, NCT 2020: Resonance, was announced, and Taeyong was confirmed as the leader of the group as a whole.

On March 15, 2021, Taeyong opened his own SoundCloud account and released a new demo single "Dark Clouds" and its remix. Since then, he has released demo singles such as "GTA1" and "GTA2", "Blue", "Monroe" (featuring Baekhyun of Exo), "Rose" (featuring Seulgi of Red Velvet) and "Swimming Pool" on the platform. "Dark Clouds" won the Top Comments Award at the SoundCloud 2021 Playback Awards, with the most fan comments in a single week on the platform in 2021. In August, Taeyong served as a judge on the dance survival show Street Woman Fighter, which gained significant popularity nationwide. He later appeared as a guest judge on the program's spin-off, Street Dance Girls Fighter, together with fellow NCT member Mark. Taeyong co-wrote the title track for NCT 127's third studio album Sticker, which went on to become the best-selling album in SM Entertainment history. He was credited as a choreographer and lyricist on the special album 2021 Winter SM Town: SMCU Express, having worked on the track "Zoo".

On March 11, 2022, Taeyong was announced to be featuring in Suran's song "Diamond" from her upcoming EP Flyin' Part 1. Taeyong later announced the opening of his YouTube channel TY Track on March 14 and released the performance video for his new song "Lonely" featuring Suran the following day. On April 14, Taeyong released the single "Love Theory" in collaboration with Wonstein through SM Station. On April 28, Taeyong was announced to be the MC of Mnet's upcoming dance show Any Body Can Dance, where he would reunite with the leaders of Street Woman Fighter. On June 2, he released a second performance video on his YouTube channel for his new song "Ghost".

Discography

Singles

Non-commercial releases

Filmography

Television appearances

Music videos

Songwriting credits 
All credits are adapted from the Korea Music Copyright Association, unless stated otherwise.

See also 
 List of awards and nominations received by NCT

Notes

References

External links 

 Tae-yong at SM Town

NCT (band) members
1995 births
Living people
SuperM members
SM Rookies members
School of Performing Arts Seoul alumni
SM Entertainment artists
South Korean songwriters
South Korean male dancers
South Korean male singers
K-pop singers
South Korean pop singers
South Korean dance musicians
South Korean male idols
21st-century South Korean singers
South Korean electronic music singers
Japanese-language singers of South Korea
People from Seoul
Singers from Seoul
Rappers from Seoul